The 1995 Utah State Aggies football team represented Utah State University in the 1995 NCAA Division I-A football season. The Aggies were led by first-year head coach John L. Smith, who replaced Charlie Weatherbie after he left to coach Navy. The Aggies played their home games at Romney Stadium in Logan, Utah. Despite a difficult 0–5 start to the season, the Aggies won four of the next six and finished third in the Big West Conference.

Previous season
Utah State finished the 1994 season with a record of 3-8, a disappointing year after having won a share of the Big West Conference championship and the Las Vegas Bowl in 1993. Head Coach Charlie Weatherbie abruptly left the Aggies on December 31, 1994 to coach at the US Naval Academy. 

John L. Smith was subsequently hired away from the University of Idaho on January 3, 1995. Smith would fill his coaching staff primarily with coaches he had known at Idaho, including coordinators Bobby Petrino and Chris Smeland.

Schedule

Season Summary

Utah State began the season in a frustrating, yet familiar, fashion as they would lose early and be unable to dig themselves out for a chance at bowl eligibility. Particularly frustrating in 1995 were the four losses in the first four games, where three games were decided by less than a touchdown and a home defeat to the Division I-AA Boise State Broncos. Failing to win two of the four games would eventually cost the Aggies a chance at a second bowl season in three years.

After another loss, this time to a strong Colorado State side, the Aggies won four of the remaining six games on the schedule. The Aggies finished with a 2-3 road record to go with a 2-4 home record.

The team was led offensively by running back Abu Wilson and wide receiver Kevin Alexander. Wilson amassed 1,476 rushing yards (5th most all-time) and 15 touchdowns (3rd most) during the 1995 season. Alexander pulled in 92 receptions (2nd most all-time) and 1,400 receiving yards (2nd most) for the season. Both players would earn First-Team All-Big West Conference honors.

Leading the way for the Aggies defensively was linebacker David Gill. The junior from Pleasanton, California would set a single season record for most tackles, with 168. It has since been surpassed only by Tony D'Amato's 170 tackles during the 1998 season. Danilo Robinson set the single game sack and tackle-for-loss record at Utah State during 1995 in a game against San Jose State, in which he accumulated five sacks and six TFLs. Gill was named to the All-Big West first team, and Robinson to the second team.

As a team, the Aggies had moments of success that could have carried them to a second Big West title in three years. However, at times the Aggies were undisciplined and prevented themselves from winning additional games. Nowhere was this lack of focus more obvious than the single-season records set by the 1995 team in penalties (116) and penalty yards (1,131). In just one loss to San Jose State, the Aggies gave up 185 penalty yards in a single game (the most ever by a Utah State team).

Awards and honors
The Aggies had five players named to either the first or second all-conference team in the Big West.

References

Utah State
Utah State Aggies football seasons
Utah State Aggies football